Heavy Is The Head... is the first solo extended play by American rapper and producer MarvWon, released October 16, 2012, following up from his 2010 album Wayne Fontes Music. Signed under Mr. Porter's My Own Planet imprint, this nine-track record featured Detroit-based artists Royce Da 5'9" (of Slaughterhouse), Fat Killahz and Kon Artis (of D12), whose production is primarily presented, along with Jay Oliver, Young Roc, Pzuvmynd, and Trox.

In 2013, Marv dropped a single for "Talk Cash Shit" and a video directed by Mario "Khalif" Butterfield. In 2014, he shot another video for "What Up".

A free digital version of the Heavy Is The Head... project is available to download on the Internet.

Track listing 

†The song "Winner's Circle" contains samples from Chanson D'Un Jour D'Hiver by Cortex (1975)

Additional personnel 
Mario Butterfield - cover art & design

References 

2012 EPs
Fat Killahz albums
Albums produced by Mr. Porter